The San Saba River is a river in the U.S. state of Texas.  It is an undeveloped and scenic waterway located on the northern boundary of the Edwards Plateau.

Course
The river begins in two primary branches. The North Valley Prong runs east through Schleicher County for 37 miles, while the Middle Valley Prong runs 35 miles through the same county.

Both merge near Fort McKavett to form the San Saba River, which flows another 140 miles east/northeast until it drains into the Colorado River east of the city of San Saba.

A major tributary is Brady Creek, which is 90 miles long and parallels the path of the San Saba to the north.

History
The river was named by the governor of Spanish Texas, Juan Antonio Bustillo y Ceballos, in 1732.  He called it Río de San Sabá de las Nueces ("River of Saint Sabbas of the Walnuts"), because he and his troops had arrived December 5, the feast day of St. Sabbas (439–532), a major figure of early Christian monastic life.

Santa Cruz de San Sabá Mission was established on the river in 1757.

Management

, the San Saba River was an overappropriated stream with large stretches of the river dry, depriving downstream riparian users of water, while upstream flow was being diminished by pumping of aquifers hydrologically connected to the stream.

See also
List of rivers of Texas

References

External links 
 

Rivers of Texas
Rivers of McCulloch County, Texas
Rivers of Schleicher County, Texas
Rivers of Sutton County, Texas
Rivers of Menard County, Texas
Rivers of Mason County, Texas
Rivers of San Saba County, Texas
Tributaries of the Colorado River (Texas)